The Aberdeen Reservoirs are a group of two reservoirs, consisting of the Upper Aberdeen Reservoir and the Lower Aberdeen Reservoir, in Aberdeen, Hong Kong.

History
The Aberdeen Reservoirs were built to augment Pok Fu Lam Reservoir in providing water supply to the west of Hong Kong Island. The Government bought the reservoir at a price of HK$460,000 and expanded it to a capacity of 486,000 cu m. At the same time, the Government built a new reservoir with a capacity of 773,000 cu m above the original one, increasing the total capacity to 1,259,000 cu m. The reservoirs were officially opened on 15 December 1931 by Governor of Hong Kong William Peel, becoming the fourth and last reservoir group ever built on Hong Kong Island, after Pok Fu Lam, Tai Tam and Wong Nai Chung.

In 1977, a 4.23 square kilometre area around the reservoir was designated as Aberdeen Country Park, one of the earliest country parks in Hong Kong.

A total of 41 pre-World War II waterworks structures located in six reservoir areas, namely Pok Fu Lam Reservoir, Tai Tam Group of Reservoirs, Wong Nai Chung Reservoir, Kowloon Reservoir, Shing Mun (Jubilee) Reservoir and Aberdeen Reservoir, were declared as monuments in September 2009; the dam, a valve house and a bridge of the Aberdeen Upper Reservoir and a dam of the Aberdeen Lower Reservoir were declared as monuments in 2009.

References

Reservoirs in Hong Kong
Aberdeen, Hong Kong
Declared monuments of Hong Kong